There are many footballers who have converted from one football code to another at a professional or representative level. In some cases, the player may also return to the original code, so the traffic is not merely one way.

In some countries, such as the United Kingdom, United States, Ireland and Australia, where multiple codes are popular, and the practice of switching codes is relatively common, such players are known as code converts or code hoppers.  In Australia, star code converts can have a substantial impact on the games.  For instance, Dally Messenger's defection from rugby union to rugby league was considered a pivotal moment in the establishment of the latter over other codes in Australia.

Globalisation is increasing the opportunities for players to transfer to different countries and to different professional sports, including the forms of football.

From American football

American football to Association football

American football to Australian rules football

American football to Canadian football
American football and Canadian football are very similar gridiron codes; talented Canadian youth players are often recruited by American universities offering scholarships, and conversely the Canadian Football League enforces roster minimums for Canadian-trained players to prevent its clubs from fielding American-dominated teams.  The CFL and NFL competed for the same player pool in their earlier years before the CFL settled into a de facto (and from time to time formal) developmental role to its American counterpart.  Dozens of professional players move between these codes' top professional leagues every year, making any attempt at a list incomplete at best.

Two quarterbacks in particular became well known in both codes. Warren Moon, a California native who starred at the University of Washington, began his professional career with the Edmonton Eskimos before crossing the border back south to the Houston Oilers and later Minnesota Vikings, earning Hall of Fame recognition in both professional leagues. Doug Flutie, who authored a comeback win for Boston College considered an iconic moment in the history of American college football, began his professional football career in the USFL before moving on to the NFL, then played a long CFL career that led to him being the first non-Canadian honored with induction to Canada's Sports Hall of Fame, before returning to the NFL to close his football career. Dwayne Johnson played college football, and was on practice squad in the Canadian Football League. Ricky Williams  played 12 seasons in the National Football League, one season in the Canadian Football League (CFL), and four years of minor league baseball for the Philadelphia Phillies.

American football to rugby league

American football to rugby union

NB:
 Isles made the Detroit Lions practice squad late in the 2013 season, after having become a sevens international. However, he never appeared in an NFL game, and has since signed a professional contract in 15s.
 Tardits switched codes twice: to American football as a young adult, and back to rugby union after a brief NFL career. He played for Biarritz Olympique and the France under-21 national team before switching to American football, and played for the USA national team after returning to his original code.

From association football

Association football to American football
Numerous American football placekickers grew up playing association football (soccer); however, very few have competed at a very high level in their original code. A large number of the first "soccer-style" placekickers of the 1960s, and early 1970s were Europeans and Latin Americans who changed codes in adulthood. Eventually, kickers who changed codes in adulthood were largely, though not completely, displaced by players who were either born and raised in the U.S. or immigrated to the U.S. at a relatively early age, thus receiving more exposure to American football than most of the first soccer-style placekickers.

Most of the women to have played men's American football have crossed over from association football.

Association football to Australian rules football
Following the establishment of AFL Women's in 2016 (the first professional women's Australian rules football competition), several Australian soccer players switched codes. Foot skills are advantageous in switching between these codes and goalkeepers have an advantage in marking and ball handling.

Association football to Gaelic football

Association football to rugby league

 St Helens R.F.C. players Steve Tyrer and Matty Smith were on the books at Wigan Athletic and Everton F.C. respectively. Tyrer was a goalkeeper and Smith was a midfielder, the latter appearing in the Everton reserve team on a few occasions.

Association football to rugby union
 Luke McAlister, a New Zealand international rugby union footballer, grew up in the north-west of England and had a trial with Manchester United before converting to rugby union at an early age.
 The late Nevin Spence, former Ulster and Ireland A player, played for Northern Ireland under 16s before switching to rugby. 
 Loreto Cucchiarelli former player-coach of the Italian rugby union team, played football for Lazio at a young age.
 Conrad Jantjes played for the youth national team of South Africa in soccer, rugby union and cricket.
 Brothers Kevin O'Flanagan and Mick O'Flanagan represented Ireland in both soccer and rugby union.
 Kenny Logan, Scottish rugby internationalist had Football trials as a goalkeeper for Dundee United and Hearts.
 England international Danny Cipriani played on the junior team of Queens Park Rangers and was offered a spot in Reading's youth setup before switching to rugby. Even after his switch, he has flirted with a return to association football, having trained with QPR, Tottenham, the Colorado Rapids, and most recently MK Dons.
 Melissa Ruscoe has not only represented New Zealand in both soccer and rugby union, but has captained both sides.
 Frank Hadden, Scottish rugby player and coach, had trials with both Queens Park Rangers and Forfar Athletic, as well as being offered a contract by Raith Rovers.
 Wesley Fofana, a France international rugby union player, grew up in the Paris region of France and trained as a youth with CFF Paris before switching to rugby union as a teenager.
 Filipo Daugunu, a Fijian-Australian rugby union player changed sports after being an amateur/semi-professional goalkeeper in Fiji.
 Paulo Scanlan, a Samoan rugby 7's player changed sports after being a professional attacking midfielder in Samoa.

From Australian rules football

Australian rules football to American football

Notably, the specialist role of punter in American football requires similar skills to those found in Australian football players.

Australian rules football to association football
International rules participation provides experience with the round ball and goalkeeping.

As well as the players below, players known to have played amateur level soccer after retiring from the AFL include Gary Ablett, James Hird, Gavin Wanganeen, Glenn Manton and Ang Christou.

Australian rules football to Canadian football
Notably, the specialist role of punter in Canadian football requires similar skills to those found in Australian football players.

Australian rules football to Gaelic football

Some players involved in the Irish Experiment to play professional Australian rules football returned to Ireland and went on to be notable in senior level Gaelic football.  Such players have included:

Australian rules football to rugby league
Early in the history of the two codes in Australia, players would interchange the codes and even had discussions of merging them into a single game. Rugby league has since evolved to specialise in physicality and body type making it more difficult for successful conversion between the two, although it does sometimes happen at junior level, particularly in areas where both codes are played (such as the Riverina region). Though the modern specialist  and  positions in rugby league can be suitable for the body type and skill of some Australian rules players. League players Darren Lockyer, Glenn Lazarus, Greg Brentnall, Chris Kinna, Kevin Proctor and Tom Trbojevic all played Aussie Rules at a junior level.

Australian rules football to rugby union

Jason Akermanis was the first professional Australian football player to suggest a switch to rugby union. Nevertheless, there are still some positions and roles that have commonalities.
Also at amateur level, conversion is quite common, as in the case of many start-up Australian rules clubs in countries such as France and countries such as New Zealand, Samoa and Papua New Guinea where there are dual-internationals at junior level.

From Canadian football

Canadian football to American football
As discussed above, Canadian and American football are highly similar gridiron codes.  Dozens if not hundreds of players and coaches move back and forth between Canadian and American codes every season and occasionally even within a season, making assembling a list of these players an impossible and largely immaterial task.

From Gaelic football

Gaelic football is especially vulnerable to code-switching, for reasons outlined by rugby union journalist Hugh Farrelly in 2009:

Gaelic football to association football

Ladies' Gaelic football to association football
Several ladies Gaelic footballers, including All-Ireland finalists, Niamh Fahey and Sarah Rowe, have gone on to represent the Republic of Ireland women's national association football team.

Gaelic football to Australian rules football

 
These two codes share many similarities, making switching between them relatively easy. International rules representation for players of both codes is common.
The Gaelic Athletic Association prohibits professionalism, meaning that there is a financial lure for players to compete in the professional elite Aussie Rules competitions in Australia.

Ladies' Gaelic football to Australian rules football

Gaelic football to rugby league

Gaelic football to rugby union

Up until the mid-1990s, both codes were officially amateur. However, the professionalisation of rugby union has provided a financial lure.

NB: Byrne and Duffy both changed codes twice. Each first switched to rugby union as a teenager, then returned to Gaelic football after a long professional rugby career. This entry discusses their Gaelic football careers before their first code switch.

Ladies' Gaelic football to rugby union
Lindsay Peat played for Dublin in the 2009, 2010 and 2014 All-Ireland finals before playing for Ireland in the 2017 Women's Rugby World Cup. The Ireland squad featured at least six other former ladies' inter-county footballers – Niamh Briggs, Claire Molloy, Cliodhna Moloney, Katie Fitzhenry, Nora Stapleton and Hannah Tyrrell.

From rugby league

Rugby league to American football

On 3 March 2015 Jarryd Hayne became the first rugby league player (that hadn't already played in the NFL) to sign a contract with a National Football League team.

Rugby league to association football

Rugby league to Australian rules football
In addition to the senior players listed below numerous schoolboy rugby league players have made a transition to success at senior Australian rules, including Wayne Carey, Paul Kelly, Kieren Jack, Andrew McLeod, Jared Brennan, Matthew Whelan, and Sam Gilbert.

Rugby league to rugby union

While the traffic used to be almost entirely from rugby union to rugby league, the tide has now turned the other way, and numerous rugby league players have gone over to union, since the game was professionalised.

From rugby union

Rugby union to American football

Rugby union and American football share the same origins, but have evolved into very different games. Both are very physical and require similar body types with high speed and strength.

Rugby union to association football

Rugby union to Australian rules football

In recent years, several schoolboy rugby union players have made a transition to Australian Rules, including Ray Smith (Queensland Under 19), Jim Stynes, Lewis Roberts-Thomson, Aaron Edwards, Adam Campbell (New Zealand Under 15), Daniel Merrett, Brad Moran (West Midlands (England) Under 16) and Tom Williams (Queensland Under 16). In 2012, Canadian Mike Pyke became the first former professional rugby player to win an AFL premiership.

Rugby union to Gaelic football

Rugby union to rugby league

Two of the closest codes, they share many similar skills. Until 1995 union was officially amateur and union players were offered money to switch codes. That trend has since reversed, as rugby union is now richer than rugby league. Conversion from one code to the other is more difficult for forwards than backs, where the skills are most similar. Several players, including Iestyn Harris and Mat Rogers, have converted between the two codes on more than one occasion.

See also
 List of multi-sport athletes
 Comparison of American football and Canadian football
 Comparison of American football and rugby union
 Comparison of American football and rugby league
 Comparison of Canadian football and rugby union
 Comparison of Australian rules football and Gaelic football
 Comparison of Gaelic football and rugby union
 Comparison of rugby union and rugby league
 List of Australian rules footballers and cricketers
 List of cricket and rugby union players
 List of cricket and rugby league players
 International Player Pathway

References

Converted from one football code to another
Converted from one football code to another
Code
Lists of sportspeople
 
Players of Canadian football
Converted from one football code to another
Converted from one football code to another